Chinese Baseball Association (Simplified Chinese:中国棒球协会) is a national non-governmental, non-profit sports organization in the People's Republic of China. It represents China in the World Baseball Softball Confederation (WBSC) and the Baseball Federation of Asia, as well as the baseball sports in the All-China Sports Federation.

See also
China Baseball League
China national baseball team
Baseball awards#China (People's Republic of China)

External links
Official Website

Baseball
Baseball
Baseball in China